Golab Mahalleh (also Romanized as Golāb Maḩalleh; also known as Gulākmaḩalleh) is a village in Daryasar Rural District, Kumeleh District, Langarud County, Gilan Province, Iran. At the 2006 census, its population was 370, in 100 families.

References 

Populated places in Langarud County